The Waitress is the second album by folk singer-songwriter Jonathan Byrd.  The album was released in 2003, the same year that Byrd won the New Folk competition at the Kerrville Folk Festival.  The Waitress reached No. 20 on the Folk Radio Airplay Chart and has been noted for Byrd's lyrical character sketches and deftly played guitar.

Track listing 
 "The Waitress" (Brown, Byrd) – 3:35  
 "The Ballad of Larry" (Byrd) – 5:01  
 "Radio" (Byrd) – 6:09  
 "The Snake Song" (Byrd) – 2:46  
 "Down the Old Mountain Road" (Byrd) – 1:56 [instrumental]
 "My Generation" (Byrd) – 3:57  
 "Small Town" (Byrd) – 3:12  
 "Tape Full of Love Songs" (Byrd) – 3:17  
 "Stackalee" (traditional) – 4:04  
 "Home Sweet Home" (traditional) – 2:19 [instrumental]
 "Being With You" (Byrd) – 3:06  
 "Fiddle and Bow" (traditional) – 3:34  
 "Rosie" (Byrd) – 3:32

Personnel 
Musicians:
Jonathan Byrd – guitar & vocals
Jason Cade – fiddle
David DiGiuseppe – accordion
Robbie Link – bass & cello

Production:
Jonathan Byrd – producer
Jerry Brown – recording, mixing, mastering
at The Rubber Room, Chapel Hill, North Carolina

Artwork:
Melanie Litchfield – photography
F.J. Ventre – graphic design at Tadpole Designs

Charts

References

External links 
The Waitress page at Waterbug Records

2002 albums
Jonathan Byrd (musician) albums